Chigliak is a record label and imprint of Jagjaguwar dedicated to albums that have had limited or non-commercial releases. It was founded in 2012 by Justin Vernon of Bon Iver.

History
Chigliak was named after Northern Exposure character Ed Chigliak, whom Vernon cited as "[his] favorite in the pantheon of characters in the history of the world. [...][H]e's sort of a representation of what we're trying to do at the label: like good music that may not be box office-smashing."

Artists

See also
 List of record labels

References

American independent record labels